Richlands is a small unincorporated farming community in Greenbrier County, West Virginia, United States, five miles (8 km) west of Lewisburg on U.S. Route 60.

The community was so named on account of their fertile soil.

Once served by Central School, a two-room schoolhouse housing grades K–9, local children now attend school in Lewisburg. The area has a Ruritan club, The Richland Ruritans, and a 4-H club, The Central Willing Workers.

References

Unincorporated communities in Greenbrier County, West Virginia
Unincorporated communities in West Virginia